Franciszek Surma (1 July 19168 November 1941) was a Polish fighter ace of the Polish Air Force in World War II with 5 confirmed kills.

Biography
Surma was born in Głębocz (present-day it is part of Gołkowice, Silesia), he was son of Franciszek and Tekla born Wodecka. In 1932 he entered the Cadets Corps in Różan, four years later he was admitted to the Polish Air Force Academy in Dęblin. On 15 June 1939 Surma was posted to the Polish 121st Fighter Escadrille in Cracow.

After the September Campaign he crossed the border with Romania, then he was evacuated to France via Liban and finally he reached Britain. After a training in No. 56 OTU Surma was assigned to the No. 151 Squadron RAF with which he took part in the Battle of Britain. On 11 September 1940 he was transferred to the No. 607 Squadron RAF, and on 26 September he shot down a Messerschmitt Bf 109. On 21 October he was ordered to the No. 257 Squadron RAF, one week later he damaged a Heinkel He 111 but was hit himself managing to bale out by parachute. From 12 December he served in the No. 242 Squadron RAF and on 3 March 1941 he arrived in the No. 308 Polish Fighter Squadron. On 11 May 1941 over Great Malvern, his Supermarine Spitfire was hit and begun to burn. Surma had to save himself by jumping with a parachute once again. From 22 July to 12 October he downed four Bf 109. On 8 November escorting bombers near Dunkirk Surma engaged Messerschmidt Bf 109's, during the fight he broke away from his squadron and never returned. His body was never found. He was probably hit by flak.

On 25 May 2002 the school of Gołkowice was named after Franciszek Surma.

Aerial victory credits
 30 August 1940 He 111 (probably destroyed)
 26 September 1940 - Bf 109
 29 October 1940 He 111 (damaged)
 26 March 1941 1/3 Junkers Ju 88 (probably destroyed)
 22 July 1941 - Bf 109
 16 September 1941 - Bf 109
 20 September 1941 - Bf 109 (and one probably destroyed)
 27 September 1941 Bf 109 (probably destroyed)
 12 October 1941 - Bf 109

Awards
 Virtuti Militari, Silver Cross 
 Cross of Valour (Poland), three times

References

Further reading
 Tadeusz Jerzy Krzystek, Anna Krzystek: Polskie Siły Powietrzne w Wielkiej Brytanii w latach 1940-1947 łącznie z Pomocniczą Lotniczą Służbą Kobiet (PLSK-WAAF). Sandomierz: Stratus, 2012, p. 546. 
 Jerzy Pawlak: Absolwenci Szkoły Orląt: 1925-1939. Warszawa: Retro-Art, 2009, p. 221. 
 Piotr Sikora: Asy polskiego lotnictwa. Warszawa: Oficyna Wydawnicza Alma-Press. 2014, p. 355–359. 
 Józef Zieliński: Asy polskiego lotnictwa. Warszawa: Agencja lotnicza ALTAIR, 1994, p. 69. ISBN 83862172. 
 Józef Zieliński: Lotnicy polscy w Bitwie o Wielką Brytanię. Warszawa: Oficyna Wydawnicza MH, 2005, p. 194–195. 
 
 
 
 

The Few
Polish World War II flying aces
Recipients of the Silver Cross of the Virtuti Militari
1941 deaths
1916 births
Polish military personnel killed in World War II
Royal Air Force personnel of World War II
Royal Air Force officers